Amor cautivo (English title Prisoner love )"", is a Mexican telenovela produced by TV Azteca in association with Corazón TV. It stars Marimar Vega and Arap Bethke as the main protagonists. Filming starts on 6 May 2012. It is based on Lejana como el viento by Laura Visconti.

In 2015,It premiered in Africa on the Eva Channel(141 English dub and 508 Portuguese dub) on DSTV.

Cast
 Marimar Vega as Alejandra Santacruz
 Arap Bethke as Fernando Bustamante Arizmendi
 Hector Bonilla as Félix Del Valle 
 Patricia Bernal as Maribel Sosa de Arismendi
 Fernando Ciangherotti as Jorge Bustamante
 Andrés Palacios as Javier del Valle 
 Eduardo Arroyuelo as Mauricio DelgadoEdmundo Grijalva/Raymundo Figueroa 
 Cecilia Ponce as Eugenia Rángel 
 Andrea Noli as Beatriz Del Valle 
 Luis Felipe Tovar as Commandante Alfredo Linares 
 Alberto Guerra as Ramiro Estrada
 Juan Pablo Medina as Efraín Valdemar 
 Vanessa Ciangherotti as Ángela
 Barbara de Regil as Vanessa Ledesma 
 Guillermo Iván Dueñas as Antonio "Tony"
 Erick Chapa as Marcelo Bustamante Arizmendi
 Patricia Garza as Tatiana
 Carla Carillo as Mariví Bustamante Arizmendi
 Alonso Espeleta as Diego Del Valle 
 Mayra Rojas as Susana 
 Carmen Delgado as Paula Manriquez 
 Daniel Martinez as Isaias 
 Marcela Ruiz Esparza as Iris 
 Estela Cano as Martha Estrada
 Israel Amescua as Bryan de Jesús
 Gina Morett as Cruz 
 Claudia Lobo as Gladys de Estrada
 Emilio Guerrero as Rufino Estrada
 Fernando Rubio as Paco 
 Fidel Garriga as Billy Thompson 
 Roberto Castañeda as Guillermo
 Keyla Wood as Panchita 
 Pilar Fernández as Rebecca 
 Karla Cruz as Carmen 
 Javier Escobar as Jairo 
 Hernán Mendoza as Camilo "Locamiro"
 Juan Manuel Bernal as Nicolas Santacruz 
 Maria Renée Prudencio as Soledad gustillo de Santacruz 
 Alicia Jaziz as Alejandra Santacruz (young)

References

External links 

 Official website

2012 telenovelas
2012 Mexican television series debuts
2012 Mexican television series endings
Mexican telenovelas
TV Azteca telenovelas
Mexican television series based on Venezuelan television series
Spanish-language telenovelas